The 116th Operational Maneuvers Regiment (116th RMO) is a special forces regiment of the Algerian Land Forces.

History 
Indeed, the 116th RMO is a recent regiment because it was created in 2015, a few months after the dissolution of the Groupement d'Intervention Spécial (GIS), this regiment was created to directly replace this unit.

Following the dissolution of the GIS, the land forces of the Algerian Army decided to create a new elite unit to replace the GIS. However, the 116th RMO has a different status because it does not depend directly on the Algerian intelligence services, as was the case for the former GIS, but it belongs directly to the command of the land forces.

They are under the direct orders of the Chief of Staff of the People's National Army, and their missions are followed up to the highest military level (the army's high command).

Moreover, the 116th RMO is the descendant of the GIS, so this regiment has naturally taken over the same missions as the latter, and is therefore capable of extremely diverse and varied operations.

The majority of operators and most of the material was transferred to this regiment.

Missions 
The 116th RMO specializes in counterterrorism, counter guerrilla actions, and the hunting of terrorists in hostile and complex areas, as well as in hostage rescue. However, it is also capable of extremely diverse and varied operations.

It can be tasked with protection of high military authorities, various special operations such as special reconnaissance and raids behind enemy lines, and other types of special missions.

The missions of the 116th RMO are therefore:

 Anti-guerrilla warfare
 Counterterrorism and hostage rescue
 Hunting terrorists in hostile and complex areas
 Special reconnaissance
 Capture or neutralization of HVTs, insurgents, or criminals
 Close protection and escort of high profile individuals
 Direct action
 Special operations
 Destruction of strategic targets, sabotage
 Intervention in the marine environment
 Technical operations

Organization 
The regiment has several companies with several specialized groups such as HAHO/HALO groups, hostage rescue groups, combat swimmer groups, search and destroy groups etc...

The 116th RMO therefore has several specialized companies:

 A general staff
 Special Company: with assault groups specialized in search and destroy (counterinsurgency, tracking and neutralization of terrorists),  HALO/HAHO groups, snipers, reconnaissance and intelligence groups...
 Intervention Company: with intervention groups specialized in counterterrorism and hostage rescue, and marine intervention groups (combat swimmers), support groups with marksmans, close protection groups with bodyguards...
 Technical intervention company: with demining groups, intrusion and dog groups...

Equipment and Armament 
Operators have access to several types of weapons that are chosen according to the needs and nature of the mission.

Each operator is equipped with a primary weapon (usually an assault rifle), a handgun, and in addition to this, various types of grenades (fragmentation, smoke, blinding, etc.).

Marksmans and snipers have a multitude of choices with regard to their weaponry, ranging from small and medium calibers to large calibers used for immaterial fire, which allows them to destroy light equipment, especially with heavy calibers such as the .50 caliber.

Handgun 
 Glock 17&18
 Caracal

Submachine gun 
 Beretta M12 
 HK MP5A5
 MP5SD3
 MP5K
 MP5A3
 HK MP7

Assault rifle 
 AKM
 AKMS
 HK G36
 M4

Machine gun 
 PKM

Sniper rifle 
 Zatsava M93 Black Arrow
 Sako TRG 22

Shotgun 
 Beretta RS 202
 SPAS 12

Personal equipment 
 Special Forces uniform (lizard, desert woodland, and desert MARPAT)
 Footwear: Tactical boots
 Helmet: Fast ops core Helmet
 Plate carrier
 Tactical vest
 Tactical thigh plate
 Tactical belt
 Elbow and knee pads
 Protective goggles
 Hood
 Protective gloves
 Thigh Holster
 Camelback
 Ghillie follows (for snipers and marksmen)

Special 
 CBRN Alert Protective Mask
Bullet shield
 Night vision apparatus
 SWORD T&D viewfinder
 Night and infrared sights
 Individual transmission apparatus
 Radios
Headset
 Demining apparatus
 Silencers (which they place on their armaments)
 Eotech viewfinder, ampoint... 
Gladius 2.0 system

Vehicles 
 All terrain vehicles Toyota Land Cruiser, Mercedes-Benz G-Class, Unmarked vehicles

Special vehicles 
 Mercedes-Benz Vario demining van
 Ford F-150 All Terrain Vehicle with Mobile Adjustable Ramp System (MARS)
MRAP (Mine Resistant Ambush Protected) International Maxxpro
 4x4 jamming vehicle Mercedes-Benz G-Class and Toyota Land Cruiser

Aerial 
 Mil Mi-171Sh of the Algerian Air Force
 Transport aircraft belonging to the Algerian Air Force (C130, Casa C295, Il-76...)

References

Military units and formations of Algeria
Special forces of Algeria